Luskintyre, New South Wales is a small rural area in the Hunter Region of New South Wales. It is off the New England Highway near Lochinvar. Luskintyre stretches over 15 kilometres between Lochinvar and Lambs Valley.  The Luskintyre bridge was used in the filming of the popular film "Tomorrow, When the War Began". The Luskintyre Aviation Flying Museum operates a private airfield in the area used for the restoration of vintage aeroplanes.

Luskintyre Airfield and Aviation Museum 
Luskintyre Airfield 

Established in 1977 which a 228-acre privately owned airfield. It main goal is to preserve vintage aircraft particularly the De-Havilland DH -82A Tiger Moth. Every two months  there is an open weekend who owners host a lunch and fly their tiger moths.

References

Suburbs of Maitland, New South Wales